Room 641A is a telecommunication interception facility operated by AT&T for the U.S. National Security Agency, as part of its warrantless surveillance program as authorized by the Patriot Act. The facility commenced operations in 2003 and its purpose was publicly revealed in 2006.

Description
Room 641A is located in the SBC Communications building at 611 Folsom Street, San Francisco, three floors of which were occupied by AT&T before SBC purchased AT&T. The room was referred to in internal AT&T documents as the SG3 [Study Group 3] Secure Room.

It is fed by fiber optic lines from beam splitters installed in fiber optic trunks carrying Internet backbone traffic. In the analysis of J. Scott Marcus, a former CTO for GTE and a former adviser to the Federal Communications Commission, it has access to all Internet traffic that passes through the building, and therefore "the capability to enable surveillance and analysis of internet content on a massive scale, including both overseas and purely domestic traffic."

The existence of the room was revealed by former AT&T technician Mark Klein and was the subject of a 2006 class action lawsuit by the Electronic Frontier Foundation against AT&T. Klein claims he was told that similar black rooms are operated at other facilities around the country.

Room 641A and the controversies surrounding it were subjects of an episode of Frontline, the current affairs documentary program on PBS. It was originally broadcast on May 15, 2007. It was also featured on PBS's NOW on March 14, 2008. The room was also covered in the PBS Nova episode "The Spy Factory".

Lawsuits

The Electronic Frontier Foundation (EFF) filed a class-action lawsuit against AT&T on January 31, 2006, accusing the telecommunication company of violating the law and the privacy of its customers by collaborating with the National Security Agency (NSA) in a massive, illegal program to wiretap and data-mine Americans' communications. On July 20, 2006, a federal judge denied the government's and AT&T's motions to dismiss the case, chiefly on the ground of the state secrets privilege, allowing the lawsuit to go forward. On August 15, 2007, the case was heard by the Ninth Circuit Court of Appeals and was dismissed on December 29, 2011, based on a retroactive grant of immunity by Congress for telecommunications companies that cooperated with the government. The U.S. Supreme Court declined to hear the case.

A different case by the Electronic Frontier Foundation was filed on September 18, 2008, titled Jewel v. NSA. After many years of litigation, on April 25, 2019, ruling from the Northern District of California for Jewel v. NSA concluded that the evidence presented by the plaintiff's experts was insufficient; "the Court confirms its earlier finding that Klein cannot establish the content, function, or purpose of the secure room at the AT&T site based on his own independent knowledge." The ruling noted, "Klein can only speculate about what data were actually processed and by whom in the secure room and how and for what purpose, as he was never involved in its operation." The Court further went on to discredit other experts called upon, citing their heavy reliance on the Klein declaration.

In the Spring of 2006, over 50 other lawsuits were filed against various telecommunications companies, in response to the article.

There has been speculation that several rooms similar to this exist all over the United States.

Gallery

See also

 Cabinet noir
 ECHELON
 Fairview (surveillance program)
 Fiber tapping
 Hemisphere Project, mass surveillance program conducted by AT&T and paid for by the DEA
 Main Core
 NSA warrantless surveillance controversy
 President's Surveillance Program
 PRISM (surveillance program)
 Signals intelligence
 Upstream collection
 Utah Data Center
 33 Thomas Street

References

External links

AT&T buildings
George W. Bush administration controversies
History of cryptography
Locations in the history of espionage
National Security Agency facilities
Privacy of telecommunications
Signals intelligence
Privacy in the United States
Organizations based in San Francisco
Individual rooms